Sean Joseph McConville (born 6 March 1989) is an English professional footballer who plays as a midfielder for  club Accrington Stanley.

Career

Accrington Stanley
McConville signed for Accrington Stanley in February 2009, from Skelmersdale United having previously been on trial with Stockport County. He made his debut for Accrington Stanley on 14 February 2009, away to Bournemouth in the 1–0 defeat coming on as a substitute in the 68th minute replacing John Mullin.

Stockport County
In July 2011, he signed for Stockport County. In March 2012, McConville joined League One Rochdale, on a loan deal for the remainder of the season. His contract with the club was cancelled by mutual consent in August 2012.

Barrow
On 14 September 2012, McConville joined Conference club Barrow on a one-month contract. Manager Dave Bayliss had previously tried to sign him on loan from Stockport during the summer of 2012 before his contract was cancelled.

Return to Accrington
McConville re-joined Accrington from Chester in 2015, and signed a new contract in January 2016. He signed new contracts in July 2017, July 2018, and July 2019.

Career statistics

Honours
Individual
PFA Team of the Year: 2017–18 League Two

References

External links

1989 births
Living people
English footballers
Association football midfielders
Burscough F.C. players
Skelmersdale United F.C. players
Accrington Stanley F.C. players
Stockport County F.C. players
Rochdale A.F.C. players
Barrow A.F.C. players
Chester F.C. players
English Football League players
National League (English football) players
Stalybridge Celtic F.C. players